Shemp may refer to:
 Fake Shemp, someone who appears in a film as a replacement for another actor or person
 Shemp Howard (1895-1955), American actor, source of the above term after actors replaced him in films after his death